Estola albostictica is a species of beetle in the family Cerambycidae. It was described by Stephan von Breuning in 1940. It is known from Brazil.

References

Estola
Beetles described in 1940